Hidden Stash II: The Kream of the Krop is the third studio album by Orange County, California hip hop group Kottonmouth Kings. It was released on October 9, 2001 under Suburban Noize Records and Capitol Records. As of the week of October 27, 2001, the album peaked at #100 on the Billboard 200.

While the album title refers to Hidden Stash, the Kings' post-Royal Highness collection of b-sides, rarities, and remixes, the album itself is a regular studio album.  The only song on Hidden Stash, Vol. 2 that had been previously released was "My Mind's Playin' Tricks on Me," a Geto Boys cover version that was recorded for the compilation album Take A Bite Outta Rhyme.

On September 15, 2009, Hidden Stash II was re-issued with the Dopeumentary DVD as Double Dose V3'', the third and final double dose set.

Track listing 

All songs written by Kottonmouth Kings, except: "My Mind's Playin' Tricks On Me" by Geto Boys and Kottonmouth Kings.

"On The Run" had a radio edit version released on test press copies.  Other than that, there were no singles released for this album.

Roles
Daddy X - Vocals, Lyrics
D-Loc - Vocals, Lyrics
Johnny Richter - Vocals, Lyrics
Lou Dogg - Drums, Percussion
DJ Bobby B: Turntables, Vocals
The Judge: Vocals, Lyrics ("Killa Kali")
Dog Boy: Vocals, Lyrics ("On The Run")
Doug Carrion: Guitar

References 

2001 albums
Kottonmouth Kings albums
Suburban Noize Records albums
Capitol Records albums
Sequel albums